Victoria Albis (d. after 1777), was a Senegalese signara.   She belonged to the most famous of the signaras on the island of Gorée in French Senegal. She was one of the most powerful business people in contemporary Senegal.

The present Henriette-Bathily Women's Museum was built by her.

Notes

Sources 
 Gorée: the island and the Historical Museum. Abdoulaye Camara, Institut fondamental d'Afrique noire Cheikh Anta Diop, Joseph-Roger de Benoist, Musée historique du Sénégal.IFAN-Cheikh Anta Diop, 1993
 Globalizing the Postcolony: Contesting Discourses of Gender and Development. Claire H. Griffiths. 2010

History of Senegal
Senegalese women
18th-century African businesspeople
18th-century businesswomen
People from Dakar

African slave traders
Women slave owners